Captain Kidd, Jr. is a 1919 American silent film produced by and starring Mary Pickford and directed by William Desmond Taylor. It is her last released film for distribution by Paramount Pictures before moving to First National. The film is based on the 1916 play Captain Kidd Junior by Rida Johnson Young. Frequent Pickford collaborator Frances Marion wrote the scenario. This film exists in an incomplete print, with only two of the five reels.

Plot

As described in a film magazine, the grandfather of Willie Carleton (Gordon) put his will in a book about pirates and buried treasure, and the book is purchased by a second-hand store run by Angus MacTavish (Aitken), who lives with his granddaughter Mary (Pickford) and a young author named Jim Gleason (MacLean). After the book comes into the hands of Mary and Jim, a lawyer and the former private secretary for Carleton's grandfather attempt to buy it back, but Mary has found a paper with a map showing where buried treasure may be found. Carleton agrees to share the treasure with the MacTavish crowd if they help find it. It is located at an old farm once owned by the elder Carleton, but now belongs to Lem Butterfield (Hutchinson). Pretending to be geologists looking for specimens, they convince the Butterfield to allow them to dig holes all over the place. The suspicions of neighbors and the constable are aroused, and the lawyer and private secretary arrive and attempt to stop the digging. A box is found, and when opened contains a note saying that the treasure mentioned in the will is the good health Willie Carleton will have from all of the exercise spent digging. When they return to the city, it turns out that this was a test as the lawyer has been holding the Carleton fortune in trust. Mary, who bought the farm with money left to her by her mother, sells it for a profit to a man who plans to run a railroad through it. Jim Gleason sells one of his novels to a publisher, and then has the courage to ask Mary a question, which at the end she gives an answer that pleases Jim and they embrace.

Cast
Mary Pickford - Mary MacTavish
Douglas MacLean - Jim Gleason
Spottiswoode Aitken - Angus MacTavish
Robert Gordon - Willie Carleton
Winter Hall - John Brent
Marcia Manon- Marion Fisher
Victor Potel - Sam, the constable
Vin Moore - Luella Butterfield
Clarence Geldart - David Grayson
William Hutchinson - Lemuel Butterfield

References

External links

Progressive Silent Film List: Captain Kidd, Jr. at silentera.com

1919 films
American silent feature films
Films directed by William Desmond Taylor
American films based on plays
Paramount Pictures films
American black-and-white films
Lost American films
1919 lost films
1910s American films